Novokalmashevo (Yañı Qalmaş) is a rural locality (a selo) in Chekmagushevsky District, Bashkortostan, Russia. The population was 143 as of 2010. There are 3 streets.

Geography 
Novokalmashevo is located 32 km east of Chekmagush (the district's administrative centre) by road. Novoyumranovo is the nearest rural locality.

References 

Rural localities in Chekmagushevsky District